The 1983 Prix de l'Arc de Triomphe was a horse race held at Longchamp on Sunday 2 October 1983. It was the 62nd running of the Prix de l'Arc de Triomphe.

The winner was All Along, a four-year-old filly trained in France by Patrick Biancone and ridden by Walter Swinburn. The filly won by a length a short neck and a nose from Sun Princess, Luth Enchantee and Time Charter in a time of 2:28.1. Fillies took the first four places in the twenty-six runner field.

Race details
 Sponsor: Trusthouse Forte
 Purse: 
 Going: Firm
 Distance: 2,400 metres
 Number of runners: 26
 Winner's time: 2:28.1

Full result

 Abbreviations: ns = nose; shd = short-head; hd = head; snk = short neck; nk = neck

Winner's details
Further details of the winner, All Along.
 Sex: Filly
 Foaled: 7 April 1979
 Country: France
 Sire: Targowice; Dam: Agujita (Round Table)
 Owner: Daniel Wildenstein
 Breeder: Daniel Wildenstein

References

Prix de l'Arc de Triomphe
 1983
Prix de l'Arc de Triomphe
Prix de l'Arc de Triomphe
Prix de l'Arc de Triomphe